Deadweight or dead weight may refer to:

Music
 Deadweight (band), a San Francisco alternative hard rock trio
 Deadweight (album), an album by Wage War
 "Deadweight" (song), a 1997 song by Beck from the film A Life Less Ordinary
 "Deadweight", a song by Roam from Backbone
 "Deadweight", a song by Parkway Drive from Deep Blue
 "Deadweight", a song by I Prevail from Trauma
 "Dead Weight", a song by Atreyu from Baptize
 "Dead Weight", a song by Pvris from Use Me

Television
 "Dead Weight" (The Walking Dead), an episode of the television series The Walking Dead
 "Dead Weight" (1971), season 1, episode 3 of the TV series Columbo

Other uses
 Deadweight loss, a loss of economic efficiency that can occur when equilibrium for a good or service is not Pareto optimal
 Deadweight tonnage, a ship's carrying capacity, which includes cargo, fuel, crew, etc.
 Dead weight or dressed weight, the weight of an animal carcass after removal of skin, head, feet, visceral organs, etc.

 Nero (Devil May Cry), a.k.a. Deadweight, a character from the Devil May Cry series of videogames

See also
 Structural load, one type of this is dead load, the fixed weight of a structure, such as a bridge on its supports